Loug Chari is one of three departments in Chari-Baguirmi, a region of Chad. Its capital is Bousso.

Sub-prefectures 
Loug Chari  is divided into four sub-prefectures:

 Bousso
 Kouno
 Bogomoro
 Bä Illi
 Mogo

References 

Chari-Baguirmi Region
Departments of Chad